This is a list of earthquakes in Vrancea County.

 Note: The list includes only at least M5.0 earthquakes.

See also
 List of earthquakes in Romania

Vrancea
Vrancea County
Earthquakes
Earthquakes